Eric Newbigging (born 27 February 1994) is a professional rugby league footballer who plays for the Illawarra Cutters in the NSW Cup. He is a Cook Islands international.

References

External links
Parramatta Eels profile
Zero Tackle profile

Living people
1994 births
Cook Island rugby league players
Cook Islands national rugby league team players
Rugby league props
Illawarra Cutters players